Bernard Long (born 1926) was a British book illustrator and comic artist who contributed many episodes of "Fliptail the Otter" to Jack and Jill in the 1970s.

Books illustrated by Bernard Long
 Prehistoric Animals, by Rupert Oliver (London, Hodder & Stoughton, 1982 )
 Prehistoric Man, by Rupert Oliver (London, Hodder & Stoughton, 1983 )
 Dinosaurs, by Rupert Oliver (London, Hodder & Stoughton, 1983 )
 Strange and Curious Creatures, by Rupert Oliver (London, Hodder & Stoughton, 1984 )
 Monster Mysteries, by Rupert Matthews (Hove, Wayland, 1988 )
 Lost Treasures, by John Wright (Hove, Wayland, 1989 )
 Victorian Children, by Anne Steel (Hove, Wayland, 1989 )
 Egyptian Farmers, by Jim Kerr (Hove, Wayland, 1990 )
 The First Settlements, by Rupert Matthews (Hove, Wayland, 1990 )
 Greek Cities, by Barry Steel (Hove, Wayland, 1990 )
 Plague and Fire, by Rhoda Nottridge (Hove, Wayland, 1990 )
 Forests, by Michael Chinery (London, Kingfisher, 1992 )

References 

1926 births
Possibly living people
British illustrators
Place of birth missing (living people)